This is a list of notable science communicators or popularizers of science, in alphabetical order by last name.

See also

References

 
Science communicators
Lists of people in STEM fields